Alexandr Bilinkis (born 28 June 1968, Kishinev, Moldavian SSR, Soviet Union) – businessman, public and diplomatic figure, philanthropist.

Alexandr Bilinkis is known as a successful entrepreneur, one of the largest investors in the food industry of Moldova.  As public figure, is known as: the President of the Jewish Community of Moldova, member of the Executive Council of the European Jewish Fund. He is the Honorary Consul of the United Mexican States in Moldova. Actively performs charitable and sponsorship activities.

Biography 

He was born into the family of geologists and members of the Academy of Sciences of the Republic of Moldova (MSSR).

Social activity

Jewish Community of Moldova 
Since 2002 Alexandr Blinkis has been actively involved in the Jewish Community life. In 2006 he was elected as co-President of the Jewish Community of Moldova, in September 2013 was unanimously elected as President of the Jewish Community of Moldova. 

Participates in cultural heritage perseveration projects of the Jewish community in Moldova. Within the framework of activities concerning festive events of the 70th anniversary of Moldova's liberation from fascism and the end of World War II, has initiated and participated in organizing and financing of the reconstruction of the memorial complex to the "Victims of Fascism".

Since 2006, Alexandr Bilinkis has been the member of the Executive Council of the European Jewish Fund, a non-governmental organization contributing to the development of European Jewry and promotion of tolerance and mutual respect in Europe.

In 2006, on the occasion of the holiday of Simchat Torah and in memory of his ancestors, he gave to the Jewish cultural center "KEDEM" in Chisinau the Torah Scroll as present.

At the Extraordinary General Assembly Session in 2017, he was elected as Vice-President of the Euro-Asian Jewish Congress.

Honorary Mexican Consul 

On 3 May 2013 Alexandr Bilinkis was appointed as Honorary Consul of Mexico in Moldova (Cónsul Honorario Alexandr Bilinkis). On 12 December 2013 was held the grand opening of the Honorary Consulate of Mexico in Chisinau. The activity of the consulate is focused on cooperation in the field of development of economic relations between Mexico and Moldova, rapprochement of these two nations, and the strengthening of human relations based on cooperation in the fields of education, culture and tourism.

Awards 

In 2008 Alexandr Bilinkis was awarded with the State award of the Republic of Moldova the Order "Gloria Muncii" (Labour Glory) for his significant contribution to the assertion of spiritual and moral values and fruitful organizational and social activities.

On 11 July 2016, Alexandr Bilinkis was honored with the American Jewish Committee Jewish Leadership award (AJC Jewish Leadership Award) for continuous efforts to rebirth, restore and unite the Jewish community in Moldova.

References

Links
 В Кишиневе почтили память жертв Холокоста
 Александр Билинкис в программе "Вечерний разговор"
 Еврейская община обвинила власти в бездействии 
 Марина Шупак о тихой Неделе памяти Холокоста в Молдове 
 Евреи почтили накануне память жертв кишиневского погрома 1903 года 
 Moldovan Jews struggle to maintain their historic community amid poverty, anti-Semitism 
 Государство скупится на восстановление исторических памятников... 
 Погром в Кишиневе: антисемитизм или испытание властей?

1968 births
Living people
Jewish anti-racism activists
Moldovan businesspeople
Moldovan Jews
People from Chișinău